The Society for the Advancement of Management, commonly known as SAM, is the oldest among professional management societies.  On November 11, 1910 colleagues of Frederick W. Taylor met at the New York Athletic Club to discuss and promote the principles of 'scientific management'.

Following two years of discussion groups and informal meetings the group came together and formed the Taylor Society on November 7, 1912.

In 1936 the Taylor Society merged with the Society of Industrial Engineers and new organization undertook the new name.  To date the Society is the world's oldest professional management society.

Society for Advancement of Management 
In 1936 the Taylor Society merged with the Society of Industrial Engineers forming the Society for Advancement of Management (SAM). International presidents of the society have been:

 1936-1937: Ordway Tead 
 1937-1939: William H. Gesell
 1939-1941: Myron H. Clark 
 1941-1942: Keith Louden 
 1942-1944: Percy S. Brown 
 1944-1946: Raymond R. Zimmerman
 1946-1947: Harold B. Maynard
 1947-1948: William L. McGrath
 1948-1949: Charles C. James
 1949-1951: Dillard E. Bird
 1951-1952: Leon J. Dunn
 1952-1953: Edward W. Jochim
 1953-1954: Bruce Payne 
 1954-1955: George B. Estes
 1955-1956: Frank F. Bradshaw
 1956-1957: John B. Joynt
 1957-1958: Homer E. Lunken
 1958-1959: Phil Carroll
 1959-1960: Dause L. Bibby 
 1960-1961: James E. Newsome
 1961-1962: Robert B. Curry
 1962-1963: Fred E. Harrel
 1963-1964: Hezz Stringfield Jr. 
 1964-1965: William R. Divine
 1965-1966: Oliver J. Sizelove
 1966-1967: Donald B. Miller
 1967-1968: James L. Centner
 1968-1969: David N. Wise
 1969-1970: Jack E. Wiedemer
 1970-1971: Carl W. Golgart
 1971-1972: Owen A. Paul 
 1972-1973: Ernest T. Tierney
 1973-1974: Warren G. Orr 
 1974-1975: James W. Bumbaugh
 1975-1976: Hal J. Batten
 1976-1977: W. H. Kirby Jr.
 1977-1978: A. T. Kindling
 1978-1979: James J. Rutherford
 1979-1980: John S. McGuinness 
 1980-1981: Clifford J. Doubek
 1981-1983: Tony Brown
 1983-1986: Moustafa H. Abdelsamad 
 1986-1987: Thomas R. Greensmith 
 1987-1988: S. G. Fletcher 

One of the main task of the Society for Advancement of Management was the recognition of achievements in the advancement of management. Fot that, the society had initiated an Award Program, which contained the Taylor Key Award, the Human Relations Award, the Gilbreth Medal, the Materials Handling Award, the Phil Carroll Advancement of Management Award, the Industrial Incentives Award, and finally The SAM Service Award Honor Society.

Taylor Key Awards 
Prominent winners of the Taylor Key Awards have been:
 Lawrence A. Appley, George W. Barnwell, Donald C. Burnham, Phil Carroll, Morris L. Cooke, Donald K. Davis, Ralph C. Davis, W. Edwards Deming, Henry S. Dennison, Hugo Diemer, M. A. Dittmer, Peter F. Drucker, H. P. Dutton, W. M. Gesell, King Hathaway, James L. Hayes, Herbert C. Hoover, Harry A. Hopf, John B. Joynt, Henry P. Kendall, Dexter S. Kimball. Axa S. Knowles, Harold Koontz, Harold B. Maynard, Robert S. McNamara, John F. Mee, Don G. Mitchell, Allan H. Mogensen, Frank Henry Neely, Kaichiro Nishino, Nobuo Noda, Harlow S. Person, Henning W. Prentis, F. J. Roethlisberger, Edward C. Schleh, Harold F. Smiddy, Brehon B. Somervell, J. Allyn Taylor, George T. Trundle Jr., Lyndall F. Urwick, and Robert B. Wolf.

References

Management organizations
Organizations established in 1936
1936 establishments in the United States